Get Close to My Love is the third album by soul singer and stage star Jennifer Holliday, released in 1987. Lead single, "Heart On The Line", reached number 48 on the Billboard Hot Black Singles chart, followed by "Read It In My Eyes". The album included a cover of the Gladys Knight & the Pips' classic "Giving Up."

Track listing
 "New At It" (Nickolas Ashford, Valerie Simpson)
 "He Ain't Special (He's Just The One I Love)" (David Pack, Michael McDonald)
 "Get Close to My Love" (Alan Glass, Cliff Dawson, Preston Glass)
 "Read It in My Eyes" (Dean Pitchford, Tom Snow)
 "Ain't It Just Like Love" (Clif Magness, Mark Mueller)
 "Heart on the Line" (Alan Glass, Preston Glass)
 "I Never Thought I'd Fall in Love Again" (Pat Hunt, Ron Cohen)
 "Givin' Up" (Clyde Wilson, Herbert Ross)

References

1987 albums
Jennifer Holliday albums
Albums produced by Tommy LiPuma
Albums produced by Marcus Miller
Geffen Records albums